Starro (also known as Starro the Conqueror) is a supervillain appearing in American comic books published by DC Comics. The character first appeared in The Brave and the Bold #28 (February–March 1960), and was created by Gardner Fox and Mike Sekowsky.

Starro is the first villain to face the original Justice League of America. Debuting in the Silver Age of Comic Books, the character has appeared in both comic books and other DC Comics–related products, such as animated television series and video games. Starro made its live-action film debut in the DC Extended Universe film The Suicide Squad (2021).

Publication history

The character debuted in The Brave and the Bold #28 (February–March 1960) in a story titled "Starro the Conqueror", which was also the first appearance of the Justice League of America. According to editor Julius Schwartz, the title "Starro the Conqueror" was inspired by a Ray Cummings story, "Tarrano the Conqueror". The second appearance of Starro was 17 years later in an 11-page Aquaman story in Adventure Comics #451 (May–June 1977). It appeared again only four years later in a two-part story in Justice League of America #189–190 (April–May 1981), then again a year after that in an alternate universe story in Captain Carrot and His Amazing Zoo Crew! #1 (March 1982), and it appeared briefly in Crisis on Infinite Earths #9 (December 1985).

In post–Crisis on Infinite Earths DC comics, Starro appeared in a five-part story in Justice League Europe #25–28 (March–July 1991) and was revamped and reintroduced in JLA Secret Files #1 (September 1997) and JLA #22–23 (September–October 1998). Another version of the character featured in the intercompany crossover JLA/Avengers #1–4 (September 2003 – May 2004); Teen Titans (vol. 3) #51–54 (November 2007 – February 2008); Green Lantern/Sinestro Corps: Secret Files #1 (February 2008) and Booster Gold (vol. 2) #13–14 (December 2008 – January 2009).

Its post–Infinite Crisis appearances include R.E.B.E.L.S. (vol. 2) #1–13 (April 2009 – April 2010) and R.E.B.E.L.S (vol. 2) Annual #1 (December 2009). Another version appears in Forever Evil #1 (November 2013), and a new version called Genetically Modified Starro appeared in New Super-Man #4 (2016).

Fictional character biography
Starro is a highly advanced alien lifeform resembling a giant starfish with a single central eye and prehensile extremities. The entity visits Earth and empowers three starfish; the creatures begin wreaking havoc, such as exploding an atomic bomb and absorbing its energy, kidnapping scientists and absorbing their brain power and placing the residents of the fictional town of Happy Harbor, Rhode Island under mental control. Eventually, they are stopped by the superheroes Aquaman, the Flash, Green Lantern, Martian Manhunter and Wonder Woman. The heroes defeat Starro by coating it with quicklime, which nullifies the entity's abilities. A segment of Starro survives and regenerates into a complete creature; however, it is stopped by Aquaman before being able to renew its plan of conquest.

Starro eventually reappears and forces humans to nurture it until it is able to assume its former proportions. Being able to reproduce asexually, Starro creates millions of miniature duplicates of itself, which the authors called spores. These spores attach to the faces of the entire population of New York, allowing Starro to control their minds with its own. The creature uses these spores to control several members of the Justice League until it is defeated by extreme cold. Later, after Superman is accidentally transported to an alternate universe, Starro is again defeated by Superman alongside Captain Carrot and his Amazing Zoo Crew, who are sentient superpowered animals. Superman then takes the defeated Starro back to his universe.

Starro later convinces Justice League Europe that it is dying and wishes to return to space. Aided by former Green Lantern Kilowog, Starro returns to his original spaceship and tricks the heroes by programming it to explode. It then releases thousands of spores over a fictional version of Western Europe. Controlling the minds and bodies of thousands of humans, Starro seizes power, with several members of Justice League Europe opposing the alien. Starro is finally defeated when the Justice League member Ice freezes the original Starro.

During JLA and referring to itself only as It, another member of Starro's species takes control of the Flash and the population of the fictional Blue Valley using spores. Although the JLA intend to intervene, they are advised against doing so by the Spectre, who reveals the alien's intention is to capture and control the heroes and use their special abilities to conquer the galaxy. The JLA requests the Spectre to temporarily remove their powers, thus eliminating the potential threat they may have posed otherwise. This tactic allows them to distract the entity while Batman disables it with extreme cold. This version of Starro returns and is revealed to be a scout for a much larger member of the species called the "Star Conqueror". Covering Europe with its body, the entity gains control of the minds of most humans while they sleep. Dream of the Endless aids the JLA in battling the entity psychically in a shared dream; simultaneously, a small team of heroes attacks its physical form. Assisted by a homeless man resisting the entity's control, the heroes free mankind from the alien's influence. Dream captures the Star Conqueror and stores the entity with his other keepsakes.

In the DC/Marvel Comics crossover JLA/Avengers, Starro battles the alternate universe superhero team the Avengers.

In the 2005–2006 "Infinite Crisis" storyline Starro appears as a member of Alexander Luthor, Jr's Secret Society of Super Villains. Starro eventually returns to Captain Carrot's universe to spark a conflict between aquatic and terrestrial creatures. Despite the efforts of the Zoo Crew, Starro floods the planet and defeats the heroes, who are then magically transported to safety with other surviving refugees by another animal team, Just'a Lotta Animals. Zoo Crew member Pig Iron battles Starro underwater, sacrificing himself as the rest of the heroes escape.

Post Infinite Crisis
During the pages of R.E.B.E.L.S., Starro's new origin was told: Starro the Conqueror was once an alien boy named Cobi who lived peacefully along with his people (specifically his brother Andrez) on the "unremarkable" planet Hatorei. The Hatorei people lived simple lives and they had few semblances of a developed world but in one respect they were unsurpassed. Once a day the planet's inhabitants would congregate in a species-wide telepathic link and open up to each other, which made their society the pinnacle of ethics and cultural stability.

However, a Starro Motherstar descended on their planet enslaving their civilization. At that point in time the Star Conquerors were only nomadic predators who wandered conquering planets until the Motherstar landed and birthed a new queen. On the planet Hatorei, things were different; the link between the people was still extant and it was impossible for the Star Conquerors to completely control the people while serving. The link between the Hatorei was filled with outrage due to their enslavement and the deaths of their people; this outrage loosened the hold of the Star Conquerors on Andrez. So while Cobi worked in the nest, his brother, driven by his people's outrage, entered the nest determined to destroy the Starro hatchlings before a new queen could be born.

Unfortunately, one of the eggs hatched and the hatchling, desperate to protect itself, used Cobi to defend against his brother's attack and in doing so led Cobi to kill Andrez. Afterward, the force that drove Andrez (the collective outrage of his people) seemed to enter Cobi who then, having been driven mad by that force, ripped the Starro off his face regaining his independence. The hatchling attacked Cobi but to no avail; as it leapt it became attached to Cobi's chest and Cobi subsequently destroyed the remaining hatchlings declaring that every Star Conqueror would be his.

Now Starro the Conqueror, he used his control of the Star Conqueror species to begin a series of conquests. While he would enslave most foes with Star Conqueror starfish, he would grant some particularly useful opponents larger starfish to wear upon their backs and a place at the head of his armies under him, allowing them free will so long as they turned their talents towards his conquests. As his empire's expansion continued, he was able to draw power from everyone so controlled. Between his mind-controlling Starros, ever-growing strength and his still independently thinking elites, his forces were unstoppable, leading him to gain control of nine galaxies.

Upon his forces reaching the Milky Way, Starro took control of L.E.G.I.O.N.'s robotic forces and used their widespread galactic influence to further his goals towards dominating the universe.

New 52/DC Rebirth
During New 52, Starro is still linked with the Justice League via historian David Graves' book making sporadic appearances throughout.

Other versions

Future version
A future version of Starro mentally enthralls the Time Master Rip Hunter, using his time-travelling technology to conquer Earth in the past. With the assistance of the villain Lady Chronos, the hero Booster Gold is able to restore history as it should be.

The Nail
In JLA: The Nail, Lois Lane discovered a splicing of Krypto and Starro seen in a LexCorp Labs facility near Smallville.

Jarro
One version of Starro is recruited to join a team to protect the universe against the Omega Titans. Convinced of the virtues of heroism by its teammate Martian Manhunter, Starro dies in battle with the Omega Titans. Batman preserves a bit of Starro's remains which grows into a new individual who Batman names Jarro, raising him as a son.

"Titans Tomorrow"
A separate future called Titans Tomorrow features Starro's being indoctrinated into the Sinestro Corps and wielding five yellow power rings, which give it additional superpowers. Using its psychic abilities, it also controls several supervillains. This version of Starro is destroyed by a future version of the Flash.

Powers and abilities
Starro is an alien conqueror with a humanoid central mind commanding spores that resemble either giant or small Terran starfish. An asexual creature, Starro's spores are capable of generating clones that act in accordance with the original's will. The clones are parasites by nature and can attach themselves to a humanoid's face, and subsequently take control of the host's central nervous system, thereby controlling the host. Control of the host is lost once removed from the victim. Originally the first Starro could transform two Earth starfish into duplicates of itself equal to it in size and power.

Both variants of the parasite are capable of energy absorption/projection, flight, changing color and self-regeneration, while the larger ones have a high degree of invulnerability as well as telepathy; the giant Starro possessing much more potent mental capabilities is able to indirectly influence the minds of a potential host race, capable of lulling countless people into an induced slumber and accessing their thoughts via dreams. Another of the original Star Conquerors possessed psychic abilities powerful enough to overwhelm and circumvent the willpower of Hal Jordan to prevent access to his Lantern Ring's abilities. Their size can also vary from being as big as city blocks to larger than a small planetary ocean body, in which case said Starro probe can radically alter the very climate, topography, and geography within its vicinity akin to terraforming. A future Starr Conqueror spore eventually came to weaponize five Qwardian power rings on its pointed tentacles; the rings could create objects based on the wielder's thoughts, but only those fueled by fear instead of willpower. Given the difficulty in their usage, Starro's capacity to use five at once indicated a mastery of the fear element and its usage in battle, as shown when it went up against multiple iterations of Titans all at once. The latest version of the Star Conqueror shows how it uses its parthenogenesic capabilities to breed microscopic clones of itself, which can be inhaled by potential victims, serving as a catalyst to affect the giant iteration's telepathic abilities.

The humanoid "Starro the Conqueror" possesses telepathy strong enough to control the entire Starro alien race and possesses immeasurable levels of physical resilience further bolstered by the energies drawn from the victims of his Starro probes. Being physically strong enough to behead the all-but-invulnerable Despero in single combat, Starro the Conqueror is all but impervious to physical harm much like his larger Starro clones; also akin to said spores the humanoid Starro can reproduce its own Starro clones from the mother Starro on his chest; a unique power of its own making is the ability to convert normal Earth-based starfish into Starro-based spores.

In other media

Television
 Starro appears in The Superman/Aquaman Hour of Adventure episode "In Captain Cuda's Clutches".
 Starro appears in series set in the DC Animated Universe (DCAU).
 Starro makes a non-speaking cameo appearance in the Superman: The Animated Series two-part episode "The Main Man" as one of several creatures held in the Galactic Preserver's private zoo. After Superman and Lobo defeat the Preserver, the former takes the creatures to new habitats in the Fortress of Solitude.
 Starro appears in the Batman Beyond two-part episode "The Call", voiced by Christopher McDonald via Superman. While in captivity, the alien spent years plotting to take over Earth. After ambushing and taking control of Superman while he was tending to its habitat, Starro spent the next several years covertly sabotaging and taking control of the Justice League via Superman. However, the alien's plot is foiled by Batman before Aquagirl and Big Barda send Starro back to its home planet.
 Starro appears in Batman: The Brave and the Bold, voiced by Kevin Michael Richardson (original form) and by Dee Bradley Baker (titan form). Throughout the episodes "Revenge of the Reach!", "Clash of the Metal Men!", and "The Power of Shazam!", several Starro parasites come to Earth and take control of several of Earth's heroes while the alien's herald, the Faceless Hunter, eliminates anyone who Starro could not possess. In the two-part episode "The Siege of Starro!", the primary Starro launches an invasion with its thralls, but Batman, Booster Gold, Firestorm, B'wana Beast, and Captain Marvel join forces to defeat it and free their allies. In response, the Faceless Hunter kidnaps B'wana Beast and forces him to combine the Starro parasites into one giant Starro. After Batman defeats the Faceless Hunter, B'wana Beast sacrifices himself to separate the Starros.
 While initially unnamed as such, Starro's species appear in Young Justice. In the episode "Downtime", Atlantean scientists discovered an individual Starro frozen in ice. Black Manta and a group of mercenaries attempt to steal it, but are thwarted by Aqualad and Garth. In retaliation, Black Manta destroys Starro before it can be thawed, but a small piece is later recovered and sent to S.T.A.R. Labs to be studied. In the episodes "Misplaced", "Insecurity", and "Usual Suspects", Sportsmaster and the Riddler steal the sample so Professor Ivo, the Brain and Klarion can infuse with it with technology and magic and create Starro-Tech so their sleeper agent Red Arrow can brainwash the Justice League on Vandal Savage's behalf. Before the Team eventually rescues the League, Savage has six Leaguers attack the planet Rimbor to remove them from Earth during the events of season two. In a flashback in the third season episode "Evolution", several members of Starro's species, including the one frozen in ice, attempted to attack Earth at the beginning of human history, only to be repelled by Savage. In the present, the Starros use an alien armada in another attempt to conquer Earth, but Savage joins forces with Darkseid to secretly destroy them, recognizing Earth's heroes were too scattered do so, and stopped them upon defeating the Starro controlling the armada. In the season four episode "Teg Ydaer!", it is revealed that the first Starro invasion was triggered by Klarion, who summoned the Starro that would go on to become frozen to Earth.
 A version of Starro is alluded to in the Smallville episode "Prophecy" via a device that Marionette Ventures uses to control Stargirl. The Toyman later uses another to make Lois Lane attack and kill the Blur.
 Starro appears in Robot Chicken DC Comics Special 2: Villains in Paradise, voiced by Kevin Shinick. This version is a member of Lex Luthor's Legion of Doom. After being flushed by Captain Cold, Starro is exposed to radioactive sewage, returns as a giant, and fights the Legion and the Justice League. Upon seeing the love between Superboy and Lena Luthor, Starro reconsiders massacring his opponents, but is killed by Batman riding a boat made by Green Lantern.
 Starro appears in the Powerless episode "Wayne or Lose".
 Starro appears in DC Super Hero Girls.
 Starro appears in the Teen Titans Go! episode "Justice League's Next Top Talent Idol Star: Justice League Edition", voiced by Greg Cipes.

Film
 Starro makes cameo appearances in Justice League: The New Frontier (2008), Justice League: Crisis on Two Earths (2010), and Justice League: The Flashpoint Paradox (2013).
 Starro appears in the DC Extended Universe (DCEU) film The Suicide Squad as its live-action film debut. This version is capable of growing larger and more powerful depending on the number of thralls it possesses or consumes. Additionally, its control is permanent and corpses will be left behind if its spawn are removed. Thirty years prior to the film, Starro was captured by American astronauts and experimented on, by using dissidents, by a team led by the Thinker in a Corto Maltesean research facility called Jötunheim. In the present, Amanda Waller sends the Suicide Squad to destroy Jötunheim before Starro can be weaponized by Corto Maltese's new regime and America's role in the experiments is exposed. Starro kills the Thinker, escapes, enslaves a large number of Corto Maltese's citizens and soldiers, and goes on a rampage until he is killed by remaining Squad members Harley Quinn, Bloodsport, King Shark, Polka-Dot Man, and Ratcatcher 2 as well as a swarm of Corto Maltese's rats.
 Starro appears in Batman and Superman: Battle of the Super Sons, voiced by Darin De Paul.

Video games
 Starro appears as a boss in the Nintendo Wii version of Batman: The Brave and the Bold – The Videogame.
 Starro makes a cameo appearance in Injustice: Gods Among Us as part of the Fortress of Solitude stage.
 Starro appears as a playable character in Infinite Crisis, voiced by Mark Rolston.
 Starro makes a cameo appearance in the Batman: Arkham Knight DLC "A Matter of Family". This version was meant to be part of a sideshow act for Seagate Amusement Park before it was abandoned.
 Starro appears in DC Universe Online.
 Starro appears in Fortnite as an equippable "back bling" called the Starro Specimen, and is included as part of Bloodsport's outfit.
 Starro appears in Gotham Knights via the "Heroic Assault" gameplay mode, voiced by Mark Meer.
 Starro appears in Justice League: Cosmic Chaos voiced by Fred Tatasciore

Miscellaneous
 Starro appears on the packaging for Mattel's San Diego Comic-Con-exclusive 2010 line, designed by Frank Varela.
 Starro appears in the Justice League: Alien Invasion 3D attraction at Warner Bros. Movie World in Australia.
 Starro makes a cameo appearance in issue #18 of Smallville Season 11 as a prisoner of the Department of Extranormal Operations (DEO).
 Starro appears in the Injustice prequel comic as a powerful Red Lantern.

References
  Text was copied from Starro (Post-Crisis) at Kaijuwikia Wiki, which is released under a Creative Commons Attribution-Share Alike 3.0 (Unported) (CC-BY-SA 3.0) license.

External links
 Starro at Comic Vine

Comics characters introduced in 1960
DC Comics aliens
DC Comics characters who are shapeshifters
DC Comics characters who have mental powers
DC Comics characters with accelerated healing
DC Comics characters with superhuman strength
DC Comics extraterrestrial supervillains
DC Comics supervillains
DC Comics telepaths
Characters created by Gardner Fox
Characters created by Mike Sekowsky
Fictional characters who can change size
Fictional characters who can duplicate themselves
Fictional characters with absorption or parasitic abilities
Fictional characters with dream manipulation abilities
Fictional characters with energy-manipulation abilities
Fictional characters with slowed ageing
Fictional characters with superhuman durability or invulnerability
Fictional monsters
Fictional parasites and parasitoids
Fictional warlords
Villains in animated television series